"Touch Too Much" is the debut single by the British band Arrows (often alternatively known as "The Arrows"), sung by Arrows lead vocalist Alan Merrill, and composed by Mike Chapman and Nicky Chinn. It was a top 10 hit on the UK Singles Chart, peaking at No. 8 in June 1974. Merrill told Songfacts that the song was turned down by David Cassidy, Suzi Quatro and Sweet.

The recording was produced by Mickie Most and released on RAK Records, distributed by EMI.

"Touch Too Much" was the Arrows' highest charting hit; it also reached No. 2 in the South African charts and was in the top 20 there for 15 weeks. The song appeared on the soundtrack of the feature film The Look of Love, a 2013 biopic of Paul Raymond.

The song was later covered by the bands Roman Holliday in the 1980s, and Hello in the 1990s.

References

External links

Arrows (British band) songs
1974 debut singles
Song recordings produced by Mickie Most
Songs written by Mike Chapman
Songs written by Nicky Chinn
1974 songs
RAK Records singles